Test cricket is the oldest form of cricket played at international level. A Test match is scheduled to take place over a period of five days, and is played by teams representing full member nations of the International Cricket Council (ICC).

Zimbabwe played their first test match in 1992, becoming the ninth test nation. Since then, they have played 111 test matches, compiling a record of 13 wins, 28 draws, and 70 defeats. As of March 2021, Zimbabwe's win percentage of 11.7% is the second-lowest of any test nation to have played at least ten matches, ahead of Bangladesh, and lower overall than any other nation except Ireland. Despite being a test nation since 1992, they accepted a voluntary suspension from test cricket in 2005, and did not play test cricket again until 2011.

This is a list of Zimbabwe Test cricket records.  It is based on the List of Test cricket records, but concentrates solely on records dealing with Zimbabwean Test cricket team, and any cricketers who have played for that team.

Key
The top five records are listed for each category, except for the team wins, losses, draws and ties and the partnership records. Tied records for fifth place are also included. Explanations of the general symbols and cricketing terms used in the list are given below. Specific details are provided in each category where appropriate. All records include matches played for Zimbabwe only, and are correct .

Team records

Team wins, losses, draws and ties 
, Zimbabwe played 115 Test matches resulting in 13 victories, 74 defeats and 28 draws for an overall winning percentage of 11.30.

First Test series wins

First Test match wins

Team scoring records

Most runs in an innings

Highest successful run chases

Fewest runs in an innings

Most runs conceded in an innings

Fewest runs conceded in an innings

Result records

Greatest win margins (by innings)

Greatest win margins (by runs)

Greatest win margins (by wickets)

Narrowest win margins (by runs)

Narrowest win margins (by wickets)

Greatest loss margins (by innings)

Greatest loss margins (by runs)

Greatest loss margins (by 10 wickets)

Narrowest loss margins (by runs)

Narrowest loss margins (by wickets)

Individual records

Batting records

Most career runs

Fastest runs getter

Most runs against each team

Most runs in each batting position

Highest individual score

Highest individual score – progression of record

Highest individual score against each team

Highest career average

Highest Average in each batting position

Most half-centuries

Most centuries

Most double centuries

Most triple centuries
No Zimbabwe batsmen has scored a triple century yet in Test cricket.

Most Sixes

Most Fours

Most runs in a series

Most ducks in career

Bowling records

Most career wickets

Fastest wicket taker

Most wickets against each team

Best figures in an innings

Best bowling figures against each team

Best figures in a match

Best career average

Best career economy rate

Best career strike rate

Most five-wicket hauls in an innings

Most ten-wicket hauls in a match

Worst figures in an innings

Worst figures in a match

Most wickets in a series

Hat-trick

Wicket-keeping records

Most career dismissals

Most career catches

Most career stumpings

Most dismissals in an innings

Most dismissals in a match

Most dismissals in a series

Fielding records

Most career catches

Most catches in a series

All-round Records

1000 runs and 100 wickets
A total of 71 players have achieved the double of 1000 runs and 100 wickets in their Test career.

Other records

Most career matches

Most consecutive career matches

Most matches as captain

Youngest players on Debut

Oldest players on Debut

Oldest players

Partnership records
In cricket, two batsmen are always present at the crease batting together in a partnership. This partnership will continue until one of them is dismissed, retires or the innings comes to a close.

Highest partnerships by wicket
A wicket partnership describes the number of runs scored before each wicket falls. The first wicket partnership is between the opening batsmen and continues until the first wicket falls. The second wicket partnership then commences between the not out batsman and the number three batsman. This partnership continues until the second wicket falls. The third wicket partnership then commences between the not out batsman and the new batsman. This continues down to the tenth wicket partnership. When the tenth wicket has fallen, there is no batsman left to partner so the innings is closed.

Highest partnerships by runs

Umpiring records

Most matches umpired

Notes

References

Zimbabwe